Sketch recognition is the automated recognition of hand-drawn diagrams by a computer.   Research in sketch recognition lies at the crossroads of artificial intelligence and human–computer interaction. Recognition algorithms usually are gesture-based, appearance-based, geometry-based, or a combination thereof.

See also
 Gesture recognition
 Handwriting recognition
 Human–computer interaction
 Multi-touch gestures
 Pen computing
 Tablet computer
 Sketch-based modeling

References

External links 

 Notes on the History of Pen-based Computing (Youtube)
 Annotated Bibliography in Tablets, Gesture and Handwriting Recognition, and Pen Computing

Human–computer interaction
History of human–computer interaction
Applications of computer vision